Johann Riegler (17 July 1929 – 31 August 2011), nicknamed Hans or Hansi, was an Austrian football midfielder who played for Austria in the 1954 FIFA World Cup. He also played for SK Rapid Wien, FK Austria Wien, and RC Lens.

Personal life
Riegler's older brother, Franz "Bobby" Riegler, was also an Austrian international footballer. Johann died on 31 August 2011 at the age of 82.

References

External links
 

1929 births
2011 deaths
Austrian footballers
Austrian expatriate footballers
Austria international footballers
Association football midfielders
SK Rapid Wien players
FK Austria Wien players
Expatriate footballers in France
RC Lens players
1954 FIFA World Cup players